The Nuclear Terrorism Convention (formally, the International Convention for the Suppression of Acts of Nuclear Terrorism) is a 2005 United Nations treaty designed to criminalize acts of nuclear terrorism and to promote police and judicial cooperation to prevent, investigate and punish those acts. As of October 2022, the convention has 115 signatories and 120 state parties, including the nuclear powers China, France, India, Russia, the United Kingdom, and the United States. Most recently, Oman ratified the convention on 21 October 2022.

The Convention covers a broad range of acts and possible targets, including nuclear power plants and nuclear reactors; covers threats and attempts to commit such crimes or to participate in them, as an accomplice; stipulates that offenders shall be either extradited or prosecuted; encourages States to cooperate in preventing terrorist attacks by sharing information and assisting each other in connection with criminal investigations and extradition proceedings; and, deals with both crisis situations, assisting States to solve the situations and post-crisis situations by rendering nuclear material safe through the International Atomic Energy Agency (IAEA).

Definition of the crime of nuclear terrorism

Article 2 of the convention defines the offence of Nuclear terrorism as follows:

At the same time, article 4 expressly excludes the application of the convention to the use of nuclear devices during armed conflicts, without recognizing though the legality of the use of nuclear weapons:

States parties 
As of October 2022, 120 states are parties to the Convention.

Signatories which are not parties 
The following states have signed, but not ratified, the Convention.

See also
Nuclear terrorism
Definition of terrorism
International conventions on terrorism

Notes

References

Further reading
 Heather R. Demner, The Nuclear Terrorism Convention: Will Detainees be classified as "enemy combatants" by the United States? 12 ILSA Journal of International & Comparative Law, 641 (2006).
 C.F. Diaz-Paniagua, Negotiating terrorism: The negotiation dynamics of four UN counter-terrorism treaties, 1997–2005, City University of New York (2008).
 Odette Jankowitsch-Prevor, International Convention for the Suppression of Acts of Nuclear Terrorism, 76 OECD/NEA Nuclear Law Bulletin (2005).
 Christopher C. Joyner Countering Nuclear Terrorism: A Conventional Response, 18 European Journal of International Law 225 (2007).
 Introductory note by A. Rohan Perera, procedural history note and audiovisual material on the International Convention for the Suppression of Acts of Nuclear Terrorism in the Historic Archives of the United Nations Audiovisual Library of International Law

External links
Text.
Ratifications.

Nuclear terrorism
Nuclear weapons policy
United Nations treaties
Terrorism treaties
Treaties concluded in 2005
Treaties entered into force in 2007
Treaties adopted by United Nations General Assembly resolutions
Treaties of Afghanistan
Treaties of Algeria
Treaties of Antigua and Barbuda
Treaties of Argentina
Treaties of Armenia
Treaties of Australia
Treaties of Austria
Treaties of Azerbaijan
Treaties of Bahrain
Treaties of Bangladesh
Treaties of Belarus
Treaties of Belgium
Treaties of Botswana
Treaties of Brazil
Treaties of Burundi
Treaties of Canada
Treaties of the Central African Republic
Treaties of Chile
Treaties of the People's Republic of China
Treaties of the Comoros
Treaties of Costa Rica
Treaties of Ivory Coast
Treaties of Croatia
Treaties of Cuba
Treaties of Cyprus
Treaties of the Czech Republic
Treaties of the Democratic Republic of the Congo
Treaties of Denmark
Treaties of Djibouti
Treaties of the Dominican Republic
Treaties of El Salvador
Treaties of Fiji
Treaties of Finland
Treaties of France
Treaties of Gabon
Treaties of Georgia (country)
Treaties of Germany
Treaties of Guatemala
Treaties of Guinea-Bissau
Treaties of Hungary
Treaties of India
Treaties of Indonesia
Treaties of Iraq
Treaties of Italy
Treaties of Jamaica
Treaties of Japan
Treaties of Jordan
Treaties of Kazakhstan
Treaties of Kenya
Treaties of Kiribati
Treaties of Kuwait
Treaties of Kyrgyzstan
Treaties of Latvia
Treaties of Lebanon
Treaties of Lesotho
Treaties of the Libyan Arab Jamahiriya
Treaties of Liechtenstein
Treaties of Lithuania
Treaties of Luxembourg
Treaties of Malawi
Treaties of Mali
Treaties of Malta
Treaties of Mauritania
Treaties of Mexico
Treaties of Mongolia
Treaties of Morocco
Treaties of Namibia
Treaties of Nauru
Treaties of the Netherlands
Treaties of New Zealand
Treaties of Nicaragua
Treaties of Niger
Treaties of Nigeria
Treaties of Norway
Treaties of Oman
Treaties of the State of Palestine
Treaties of Panama
Treaties of Paraguay
Treaties of Peru
Treaties of Poland
Treaties of Portugal
Treaties of Qatar
Treaties of South Korea
Treaties of Moldova
Treaties of Romania
Treaties of Russia
Treaties of San Marino
Treaties of Saudi Arabia
Treaties of Serbia
Treaties of Slovakia
Treaties of Slovenia
Treaties of the Solomon Islands
Treaties of South Africa
Treaties of Spain
Treaties of Sri Lanka
Treaties of Saint Lucia
Treaties of Saint Vincent and the Grenadines
Treaties of Sweden
Treaties of Switzerland
Treaties of North Macedonia
Treaties of Tajikistan
Treaties of Tunisia
Treaties of Turkey
Treaties of Turkmenistan
Treaties of Ukraine
Treaties of the United Arab Emirates
Treaties of the United Kingdom
Treaties of the United States
Treaties of Uruguay
Treaties of Uzbekistan
Treaties of Vietnam
Treaties of Yemen
Nuclear technology treaties
2005 in New York City
Treaties extended to Macau